Khetag Feliksovich Kochiyev (born 18 December 1999) is a Russian football player who plays for FC Alania Vladikavkaz.

Club career
He made his debut in the Russian Football National League for FC Alania Vladikavkaz on 1 August 2020 in a game against FC SKA-Khabarovsk, as a starter.

Career statistics

Club

References

External links
 
 Profile by Russian Football National League
 

1999 births
Sportspeople from Vladikavkaz
Living people
Russian footballers
Association football defenders
FC Spartak Vladikavkaz players
Russian First League players
Russian Second League players